The River Glen (or the Glen River) divides the parishes of Glencolmcille and Kilcar in the southwest of County Donegal, Ireland.  It is most famous for its waterfalls, known by anglers as the "Salmons Leap", and as the name suggests, the falls are a good place to catch salmon. The river rises in the mountains above Ardara and empties into Teelin estuary in the shadow of Sliabh a Liag.

Rivers of County Donegal